Olly Smith (born 18 September 1974) is a British TV presenter, wine expert, columnist and author.

Education and career
Having discovered a love for singing at the tender age of eight, he was a chorister at King's College, Cambridge, which saw him travel far and wide to sing, including to Japan, East Berlin and Finland, and earned him a music scholarship at Charterhouse School, where he met his wife and chief of staff Sophie Smith. He gained a Master's degree in English Literature at Edinburgh University.

Growing up, Smith worked in a wine shop as a cellar boy. He worked as a film and TV writer until he took part in Hardys-backed TV competition Wine Idol in 2005, and won. Part of his prize was an audition to appear on Great Food Live.  Realising that there were opportunities for him to make a career in wine on television, Smith made his segue from screenwriting, studying wine in his spare time. He eventually made it onto a Sky One series, Taste, which opened up the many TV opportunities he has since enjoyed, including the Richard and Judy Wine Club, Saturday Kitchen, The Wheel, Mastermind, Tipping Point and more.

Family background
The son of a nurse and a music teacher, Smith's older brother is the comedian and writer Will Smith. Smith was born in Darlington, County Durham and grew up in Jersey. As a child he was a chorister in the Choir of King's College, Cambridge. He lives in Sussex with his family.

Writing

Smith is the drinks columnist for the Mail on Sunday's YOU magazine.

He has written five books, Eat & Drink: Good Food That’s Great to Drink With in 2010, Wine: Both Barrels in 2012, Behind Enemy Wines in 2013, Drinking For Chaps in 2018, and Fizz in 2019. His sixth book, Home Cocktail Bible, was published in November 2021.

Smith previously wrote for film and TV including three series of Pingu, Wallace and Gromit and Charlie and Lola.

Television 
Smith regularly appears as a drinks expert on BBC1's Saturday Kitchen and has recently appeared on Pointless Celebrities, Michael McIntyre’s The Wheel and Question of Sport.

He presented two series of Ale Trails for the Travel Channel in 2016 and 2017 and in September 2014 presented a four-part series Last Taste of Summer, which aired on This Morning.

In 2011, he presented a ten-part series for Channel 4 entitled The Secret Supper Club. and in 2010, he hosted the short-lived Iron Chef UK.

Outside of the UK, he presented a documentary series about Chilean wine, Uncorking the South, for Canal 13.

He is also a voice-over artist, narrating Chic Eats for The Discovery Channel, performing voices for ITV show The Amazing Adrenalini Brothers as well as writing and presenting Dude, Where's My Title? for BBC Radio 4. He also performed alongside Roger Moore in The Fly Who Loved Me Christmas cartoon for UNICEF.

In February 2022, Smith won an episode of Celebrity Mastermind; his specialist subject was the 1987 British black comedy film Withnail and I.

 Podcast 
Smith’s popular drinks podcast A Glass With'' is in its tenth series with a celebrity guest in each episode. Previous guests include Pink, Kylie Minogue, Sting and Trudie Styler and actor Sam Neill. The format sees Smith share a glass with his guest while chatting informally around a variety of subjects. The podcast is produced by Pod Monkey in the UK and has attracted sponsorship from Majestic Wine, Inter Rhône, Babylonstoren, Regal Rogue Vermouth and The Wine Society.

Smith has made guest appearances on numerous other podcasts, including Grilled by The Staff Canteen, On Jimmy's Farm, The Moon Under Water, Two Guys One Topic, The English Wine Diaries and The Bubble.

P&O Cruises 
Smith is a 'Food Hero' for P&O Cruises and has a group of award winning Glass House wine bars across the fleet including its newest flagship cruise ship, Iona.

Awards
In 2011, Smith was named by Off Licence News among the top 75 most influential people in the UK wine trade.

Best Drinks Writer – Great British Food Awards 2019, 2017 & 2016
United Kingdom Vineyards Association Communicator of the Year 2012
Roederer Awards Finalist for International Columnist of the Year 2012
Wines of Portugal Journalism Award 2012
International Wine & Spirits Communicator of the Year Award 2009 
Drinks Business Young Achiever of the Year Award 2009

Patron 
Smith is a patron of the Bumblebee Conservation Trust and The Drinks Trust.

References

External links
Official website
Olly Smith interviewed on Metralla Rosa

Wine critics
British television presenters
Living people
People educated at Victoria College, Jersey
People educated at Charterhouse School
Jersey people
1974 births
Choristers of the Choir of King's College, Cambridge